Izabela Kuna (born 25 November 1970, Tomaszów Mazowiecki) is a Polish film, television and theatre actress as well as a blogger.

Life and career
She was born on 25 November 1970 in Tomaszów Mazowiecki. In 1989, she graduated from the Stefan Żeromski High School No. 2 in Tomaszów Mazowiecki. In 1993, she graduated from the National Film School in Łódź.

In 2004, she won the Grand Prix at the "Two Theatres" Festival in Sopot for her role in a play Łucja i jej dzieci (Lucy and Her Children). She gained popularity by appearing in TV soap operas such as Barwy szczęścia broadcast on TVP2 Channel. In 2013, she published her first book entitled Klara. She starred in numerous films including Krzysztof Krauze's 1999 film The Debt, Małgorzata Szumowska's 2008 film 33 Scenes from Life, Tomasz Wasilewski's 2013 LGBT-themed drama film Floating Skyscrapers, Wojciech Smarzowski's 2016 historical drama film Volhynia, Marie Noëlle's 2016 biopic Marie Curie: The Courage of Knowledge and Wojciech Smarzowski's 2018 drama film Clergy.

Appearances in film and television
1995: Archiwista as Krystyna Wagner, Zbigniew's wife
1996: Ekstradycja 2 as an UOP secret agent (episode 2)
1996: Dom as a TV reporter (episode 16)
1997: Historie miłosne as a nun
1997–1999: Klan as Ewa Kowalik
1999: Na koniec świata as Wiktor's model
1999: The Debt as Matczak's wife
2002: Psie serce as Dorota
2003: M jak miłość as a nurse
2003: Kasia i Tomek (season 2) as Lena (episode 6)
2003: Daleko od noszy as Krystyna Nosoń (episode 4)
2003: Ciało as sister Felicyta
2003–2007: Na Wspólnej as Aneta Czarnecka
2004: Talki z resztą as Marta Boniatowska (episode 6)
2004: Plebania as Bożena Paprocka
2004: Na dobre i na złe as Beata Skowron (episode 200)
2004: Kryminalni Anny Szennert's neighbour (episode 8)
2005–2006: Tango z aniołem as Ewa Rynwid
2006: Jan Paweł II as Emilia Wojtyła, Karol's mother
2006: Magda M. as Edyta Garnicka (episode 31)
2006: Job, czyli ostatnia szara komórka as Chemik's mother
2007: Prawo miasta as Emilia Gralczyk, Edward's wife
2007: Jak to jest być moją matką as Monika Motyka
2007: Hindenburg: The Untold Story as Mathilda Doehner
2007: Ekipa as a director of children's hospice
2007: Cztery poziomo as Łańcuszek's wife
2007–2016: Barwy szczęścia as Maria Pyrka-Złota
2008: Lejdis as Gośka
2008: 33 sceny z życia as Kaśka
2009: Złoty środek as Ula
2009: Miłość na wybiegu as Ilona
2009: Idealny facet dla mojej dziewczyny as Klara Rojek
2009: Galerianki as Alicja's mother
2010: Śniadanie do łóżka as Ewa
2010–2011: Szpilki na Giewoncie as Eliza Morawska
2010: Lincz as Jagoda Słota
2010: Joanna as Ewa
2011: Popatrz na mnie as Agnieszka
2011: Pokaż, kotku, co masz w środku as Alicja
2011: Komisarz Alex Ewa Malczewska (episode 3)
2012: Supermarket as Bogusia Warecka
2012, 2014–2015: Krew z krwi as Sandra Kozłowska
2012–2013: Piąty Stadion as Joanna
2013: Wspomnienie poprzedniego lata as Krystyna
2013: Run Boy Run as Kowalska
2013: Floating Skyscrapers as Krystyna, Michał's mother
2013: Ojciec Mateusz as Hanna Waga, Jacek's wife (episode 113)
2013: Drogówka as Ewa
2014: Warsaw by Night as Iga
2014: The Mighty Angel as Katarzyna
2014: Kochanie, chyba cię zabiłem as Janina Pokojska
2014: Baron24 as Sylwia Baron
2015: Web Therapy as Roma Dudek (episode 4)
2015: Na dobre i na złe as Danka (episode 600)
2015: Singielka as Dorota Łapacka
2016: Volhynia as Głowacka, Zosia's mother
2016: Szatan kazał tańczyć as Monika
2016: Marie Curie: The Courage of Knowledge as Bronisława Skłodowska, Maria's sister
2017: Spitsbergen as Julka's mother
2017: PolandJa as Jola
2017: Miasto skarbów as "Mother", ABW Director
2017: Listy do M. 3 as Agata
2017: Komisarz Alex as Wiktoria Książek (episode 113)
2017: Dom pełen zmian as Magda Malinowska
2017: Amok as Lidia
2017: Ach śpij kochanie as Jadwiga Suchowa
2018: Za marzenia as Bartek's mother
2018: Trzecia połowa as Joanna Konopka (episode 8)
2018: Pitbull. Ostatni pies as Regina
2018: Drogi wolności as Janina Biernacka, Ignacy's sister
2018: Clergy'' as an ethics teacher

See also
Polish cinema
Polish Film Awards

References

1970 births
Living people
Polish film actresses
People from Tomaszów Mazowiecki
Polish stage actresses
Polish television actresses